Centrifugal casting, also commonly known as spin casting is typically used for industrial manufacturing of cast parts. It was the work of A. G. Eckhardt in 1809 to develop a patent showing the basic principles involved with the process. Centrifugal casting is one of the few casting processes that can be used both to manufacture metals as well as plastic parts. Parts ranging from belt buckles, medallions, figurines, and souvenirs to "pot metal" gears and machine parts, bushings, and concrete expansion fasteners are usually manufactured using this process. Spin casting or centrifugal casting is considered to be a relatively inexpensive process ranging to a total cost of no more than a $20,000 investment requirement, in comparison to a process such as investment molding that costs a lot more (usually millions). Centrifugal casting is a popular process for the petrochemical market, defense market, and virtually any other market who needs good quality products at a low manufacturing cost.

Process variants 
Centrifugal casting is a metal casting technique that uses the forces of centripetal acceleration to distribute the molten material in the mold. Molten metal is typically fed into the mold using a spout. The process is then completed using rollers that rotate the mold about its axis causing the liquid metal to form to the mold and harden as the rotation continues.  Rotation speeds and pouring rates are specific to the material being used and the design specifications. The true centrifugal casting technique can be performed using both vertical as well as horizontal rotation. The vertical rotation technique is generally used for the smaller parts whereas the longer parts are formed using the horizontal technique.

Horizontal 
The horizontal method is utilized for castings that have a much larger length than diameter and a cylindrical bore in the center. Complex shapes are not obtainable through this process; however, this process is very useful for making things such as piping and tubing. The trouble with this process is the slip that occurs between the metal and the mold as the mold rotates, causing the metal to move slower than the mold.

Vertical 
This method is usually used to cast parts in which the diameter exceeds the length. Vertical casting can produce both cylindrical and non-cylindrical castings. These non-cylindrical castings include ball valve balls, gear blanks, and conical shaped parts. Unlike the horizontal method, no slip occurs between the metal and mold due to the constant resultant force applied during rotation.

Semi-centrifugal 
Semi-centrifugal casting is a variant of centrifugal casting. The main difference being that the mold is completely filled during the process through the use of a central sprue. If a central bore is required in the casting, a dry sand core is best suited. This process can be completed using either permanent or, the more popular, sand molds. The rotational symmetry produced by this process make it ideal for objects such rail car wheels and pulleys.

Design considerations 
Many factors go into the design of a centrifugal casting process. The desired size and shape of the finished product govern whether the horizontal or vertical method should be used. In addition, the type of material used and the desired dimensions aid in deciding the correct rotation speed and pouring flow rate. In order to compensate for the extreme weight of the metal and the forces exerted by rotation, the apparatus needs to have a sturdy foundation to ensure quality and safety.

Features

Geometric capabilities 
Centrifugal casting is not capable of producing complex geometry. However, the variations in the processes allow for different geometric capabilities. For instance, the horizontal method mainly produces piping whereas the vertical method can produce parts as complex as a propeller.

Surface finishing 
The method produces finished products that have a smooth surface finish.  This can be obtained as the die of this kind of process is usually that of a smooth finish and not an uneven or a sand like material. The centrifugal action of the process results in the material having very fine grain on the outer surface. Quality castings with good dimensional accuracy can be produced with this process.

Pros and cons

Advantages 
 This method is cost effective.
 Both ferrous and non-ferrous metals can be used.
 The equipment can be used for multiple types of metals without sacrificing quality.
 Impurities are pulled toward the inside surface and can be easily machined.
 Castings with good dimensional accuracy and quality are produced.
 Can produce castings with up to 10 feet in diameter and 50 feet in length.
 High rate of productivity.

Disadvantages 
 Cannot produce complex geometric shapes.
 Segregation and Banding: "zones of segregated low melting point constituents such as eutectic phases and sulphide and oxide inclusions".
 Raining: the mold rotating too slowly or the pouring rate too fast can result in the metal falling down from the top of the rotation onto the bottom 
 Vibration defects due to improper mounting and faulty equipment.

Process videos
 Horizontal Casting
 Vertical Casting

References

Metalworking
Casting (manufacturing)
1809 introductions